

Distribution

Distribution of A69 places nodal center in the Levant, but high levels in West Africa. The model of human genetic origin places first migrations from Eastern Africa. However, in many east African populations the frequency of A69 is zero. A more consistent model of A69 distribution is either a subsequent migration from West Africa, supported by A36 and HLA DR3-DQ2. The higher levels in the Gaza Palestinians supports this hypothesis.

Disease associations
A69 may be associated with sarcoidosis.

References

6